The 2013–14 Ligue 2 was the 75th season of second-tier football in France. The season began on 2 August 2013 and ended on 16 May 2014, with the winter break in effect between 20 December and 10 January.

Teams

Stadia and locations

Personnel and kits 
Note: Flags indicate national team as has been defined under FIFA eligibility rules. Players and managers may hold more than one non-FIFA nationality.

1Subject to change during the season.

Managerial changes

League table

Results

Statistics

Top goalscorers

Source: Official Goalscorers' Standings

Top assists

Source: Official Assists' Table

References

External links

 Ligue 2 official website 

Ligue 2 seasons
2
Fra